New Blood is an anthology of British and Commonwealth poetry edited by Neil Astley and published by Bloodaxe Books in 1999.

Critical reception
Poets are introduced by short paragraphs put together by the editor, but often featuring blurb-like quotes from other contributors to the anthology; New Blood has been criticized as being "a family affair" ... "one feels one has stumbled, cold and sober, on a stranger’s wedding reception, where everyone has long since become embarrassingly intimate."

Contributors
In the order presented in the anthology the contributors are: John Kinsella · Pauline Sainer · Deborah Randall · Marion Lomax · Imtiaz Dharker · Geoff Hattersley · Brendan Cleary · Maura Dooley · W. N. Herbert · Jackie Kay · Ian Duhig · Elizabeth Garrett · Linda France · Anne Rouse · Moniza Alvi · Stephen Knight · Katie Donovan · Chris Greenhalgh · Ann Sansom · Tracy Ryan · Maggie Hannan · Gwyneth Lewis · Julia Copus · Eleanor Brown · Tracey Herd · Katrina Porteous · Roddy Lumsden · Gillian Ferguson · Jane Holland · Jackie Hardy · Clare Pollard · Frieda Hughes · Nick Drake · Amanda Dalton · Christina Whitehead · Polly Clark · Joanne Limburg · Jane Griffiths

References
 Redmond, John: 'Bloodbath', a review in Thumbscrew 15

Notes

Poetry anthologies